This is a list of those members of the Russian Imperial Family who bore the title velikiy knjaz (usually translated into English as grand duke, but more accurately grand prince). This courtesy title was borne by the sons and male-line grandsons of the Emperor of all the Russias, along with the style of His Imperial Highness. They were not sovereigns, but members and dynasts of the House of the reigning emperor.

The title grand prince is the English translation of the Russian великий князь. The Slavic knyaz and the Baltic kunigaitis (both nowadays usually translated as prince) is a cognate of king.

Grand dukes of Russia of the House of Romanov-Holstein-Gottorp

See also
List of Grand Duchesses of Russia

References

 
Grand Dukes
Russia
Russia